The acronym ATFE may reference these different entities:

Association of Firearm and Tool Mark Examiners, an organization of forensic scientists (preferred acronym AFTE)
Bureau of Alcohol, Tobacco, Firearms and Explosives, a US federal law enforcement agency (internally known as ATF)
Appellate Tribunal for Foreign Exchange, also known as the FEMA Tribunal, is the Indian Tribunal for violations of its Foreign Exchange Laws.